John Stephenson,  (born 28 May 1952) is a British director and a former vice-president and creative supervisor for Jim Henson's Creature Shop. He was nominated for a BAFTA film award in 1985 for Dreamchild and in 1991, he won an Academy Award by the Academy of Motion Picture Arts and Sciences.

Early life
Stephenson was born in London, England. Educated at the Kingston School of Art and then the Royal College of Art, graduating in 1979. He moved to the USA and had a brief spell working as a designer of prestigious-fashion West End Interiors in Los Angeles.

Career
Joining the Jim Henson's Creature Shop in the early 80s, Stephenson became a member of the unique group of artists designers and crafts people working on the ground-breaking film The Dark Crystal. in addition to working as a mechanical designer, he also served as an assistant cable control puppeteer on Dreamchild. Subsequently, in 1985, he became Creative Supervisor and later served as Executive Vice President and CEO of the Creature Shop.

His work for Henson productions included The Storyteller (TV series), Labyrinth (1986 film), The Witches (1990 film), and Dinosaurs (TV Series). Stephenson art directed Jacque Annaud's The Bear (1988 film) and contributed to the film Teenage Mutant Ninja Turtles (1990 film) for which Jim Henson's Creature Shop provided ninja turtle suit puppets.

In 1987, along with two other colleagues, Stephenson was nominated for a BAFTA film award for best special visual effects in the 1985 British drama film Dreamchild.

In the 1991 64th Academy Awards, John, along with four other colleagues, received a Scientific and Engineering Award by the Academy of Motion Picture Arts and Sciences for the development of the Henson Performance Control System. In the same year, he was also nominated in the Saturn Award for Best Make-up at the Academy of Science Fiction, Fantasy & Horror Films for his work in The Witches (1990 film).

John Stephenson gained vast experience with supervising puppetry, CG animation, creature-effects, animatronics and visual effects which span a wide range of stories and styles that include Return to Oz, The Flintstones (film), The Neverending Story III, Babe (film), Loch Ness (film), The English Patient (film) and Lost in Space (film). 

With this broad experience, he drew on to launch his directing career, applying his hand to both commercials and feature films involving creature-effects, helming the Hallmark/Creature Shop co-production of Animal Farm (1999 film) and it’s this background that has shaped his directing style into what it is today.

In 2000, John was awarded an OBE in the Queen's Millennium 2000 New Year Honours list for services to computer animation industry as a designer for the Millennium Project. His film Animal Farm (1999 film) was also nominated for best film in the 2000s Fantasporto International Fantasy Film Award and nominated for the Starboy Award in the 2000s Oulu International Children's and Youth Film Festival.

In 2001, John worked as Animation Director for the French historical action horror film Brotherhood of the Wolf which involved creating special effects for the creature are a combination of computer generated imagery, as well as puppetry and animatronics.

Stephenson directed the film adaptation of the novel Five Children and It in 2004, which features live action and computer animation. Additionally, in 2013 Stephenson directed the film adaptation of Max Lucado's novel The Christmas Candle (novel) which was distributed by EchoLight Studios in the US and by Pinewood Pictures in the UK.

In 2014, John Stephenson developed, co-wrote and directed Interlude in Prague which was shot entirely on location in the Czech Republic. In November 2017, the film won a Golden Angel Award for the Best International Co-Production Film at the Chinese American Film Festival.

In February 2019, John directed a short film for the British electronic music group Hybrid starring James Purefoy who he worked with on his film Interlude in Prague the year before.

In June 2020, Deadline Hollywood reported that Stephenson was directing the epic historical drama feature film The Lady of Heaven with Enlightened Kingdom production company.

Filmography

Commercials
 Flymo "Rake"
 Legoland "Fire"
 Lemsip "Day & Night"
 Coral (bookmaker) "Hot Air"
 McDonald's "Monopoly"
 Comfort (fabric softener) "A Day In The Life"

Additional credits

Awards and nominations

References

External links
 
 
 
 

1952 births
Living people